Dashti (also Romanized as Dashtī; also known as Dastī) is a village in Keraj Rural District, in the Central District of Isfahan County, Isfahan Province, Iran. At the 2006 census, its population was 2,730, in 686 families.

References 

Populated places in Isfahan County